The Great Chess Movie is a 1982 Canadian film directed by Gilles Carle and Camille Coudari, starring Bobby Fischer, Viktor Korchnoi, Anatoly Karpov and Ljubomir Ljubojević among other notable chess players.

The 80-minute documentary is produced by the National Film Board of Canada (NFB).

The film was a Genie Award nominee for Best Documentary at the 4th Genie Awards in 1983.

References

External links

1982 films
Canadian documentary films
Films about chess
1980s French-language films
National Film Board of Canada documentaries
Films directed by Gilles Carle
1982 documentary films
Works about Bobby Fischer
French-language Canadian films
1980s Canadian films